Plínio Marcos de Barros (29 September 1935 — 19 November 1999) was a Brazilian writer, actor, journalist and playwright, author of several stage plays adapted into film. Called a "Poète maudit" by some, his work features the life and struggles of underground characters, touching themes such as violence, prostitution and homosexuality, and was censored by the military government.

Early life 
Marcos was born in 1935, in Santos, into a poor family.  He finished only the primary school before dropping out. Marcos worked as coppersmith, served the Brazilian Air Force and played football for Portuguesa Santista, but he found his way into acting working as a circus clown when he was 17 years old. He also acted in the radio and television, in Santos.

In 1958, influenced by the writer and journalist Pagu, he got into a Santos amateur theater company. That same year, impressed by the true story of a young man gang-raped in prison, he wrote his first play, Barrela. Because of its crude language, the play was prohibited from being staged for 21 years.

In 1960, at the age of 25, he went to São Paulo, where he initially worked as a street vendor. Later, he worked in theater, as an actor (appeared in the TV Tupi series O Falcão Negro ), administrator and handyman, in theater companies like Arena, Cacilda Becker and Nydia Lycia. From 1963, he produced texts for the TV Tupi show TV de Vanguarda, where he also worked as a technician. In 1964, year of the military coup, he made the script for the show Nossa gente, Nossa Música. In 1965, he managed to stage Reportagem de um tempo mau, a collage of texts by several authors, and that was only one day in the theaters.

In 1968, he participated as an actor in the telenovela Beto Rockfeller, as the driver Vitório. He reprised that role in the movies and also in the 1973 telenovela, A volta de Beto Rockfeller, with less success. Still in the cinema, during the movement of the cinema marginal, the director Braz Chediak adapted two of its plays, Navalha na Carne (1969) and Dois Perdidos Numa Noite Suja (1970), both with the actor Emiliano Queiroz. In the 1970s, Plinio Marcos returned to the stage, getting himself to sell tickets at the theaters entrance. At the end of the play, he would take the stage and chat personally with the audience.

Marcos also wrote for newspapers such as Folha de S. Paulo, Última Hora and O Pasquim.

 Death 
Marcos died on 29 November 1999, after suffering two strokes and having the left side of his body paralyzed. His body was cremated and the ashes were scattered to the ocean in Santos.

 Personal life 
Marcos was married to the actress Walderez de Barros, with whom he had three children, and with the journalist Vera Artaxo.

 Works 

 Adult plays 
 Barrela, 1958
 Os fantoches, 1960
 Jornada de um imbecil até o entendimento (1ª version)
 Enquanto os navios atracam, 1963
 Quando as máquinas param (1ª version)
 Chapéu sobre paralelepípedo para alguém chutar (2ª version of Os fantoches)
 Reportagem de um tempo mau, 1965
 Dois perdidos numa noite suja, 1966
 Dia virá (1ª version of Jesus-homem), 1967
 Navalha na carne, 1967
 Quando as máquinas param (2ª version of Enquanto os navios atracam), 1963
 Homens de papel, 1968
 Jornada de um imbecil até o entendimento (3ª version of Os fantoches)
 O abajur lilás, 1969
 Oração de um pé-de-chinelo, 1969
 Balbina de Iansã (musical), 1970
 Feira livre (opereta), 1976
 Noel Rosa, o poeta da Vila e seus amores (musical), 1977
 Jesus-homem, 1978 (2ª version of Dia virá, 1967)
 Sob o signo da discothèque, 1979
  Querô, uma reportagem maldita (adaptation of the 1976 novel of same name), 1979
 Madame Blavatski, 1985
 Balada de um palhaço, 1986
 A mancha roxa, 1988
 A dança final, 1993
 O assassinato do anão do caralho grande (adaptation of the novella with the same name), 1995
 O homem do caminho (monologue, originally titled Sempre em Frente), 1996
 O bote da loba, 1997
 Chico Viola (unfinished), 1997

 Children's plays 
 As aventuras do coelho Gabriel, 1965
 O coelho e a onça (história dos bichos brasileiros), 1998
 Assembléia dos ratos, 1989
 Seja você mesmo (unfinished)

 Books 
 Navalha na carne (play), 1968
 Quando as máquinas param (play), 1971
 Histórias das quebradas do mundaréu (short stories), 1973
 Barrela (play) (1976)
 Uma Reportagem Maldita - Querô (novel), 1976
 Inútil canto e inútil pranto pelos anjos caídos (short story), 1977
 Dois perdidos numa noite suja (teatro), 1978
 Oração para um pé-de-chinelo (teatro), s/data
 Jesus-homem (teatro), 1981
 Prisioneiro de uma canção (contos autobiográficos), 1982
 Novas histórias da Barra do Catimbó (contos), s/d
 Madame Blavatski (teatro), 1985
 A figurinha e os soldados da minha rua - histórias populares (relatos autobiográficos), 1986
 Canções e reflexões de um palhaço (textos curtos), 1987
 A mancha roxa (teatro), 1988
 Teatro maldito teatro (contém as peças Barrela, Dois Perdidos Numa Noite Suja e O Abajur Lilás), 1992
 A dança final (teatro), 1994
 Ns triha dos saltimbancos (conto),  data imprecisa
 O assassinato do anão do caralho grande (noveleta policial e peça teatral), 1996
 Figurinha difícil - Pornografando e subvertendo (relatos autobiográficos), 1996
 O truque dos espelhos (contos autobiográficos), 1999
 Coleção melhor teatro (com as peças Barrela, Dois perdidos numa noite suja, Navalha na carne, Abajur lilás, Querô), 2003

References

 External links 
  Official Site (in Portuguese)
 "Marcos, Plínio (1935 - 1999)", biography in Enciclopédia Itaú Cultural - Teatro''

Actors from São Paulo (state)
20th-century Brazilian dramatists and playwrights
1999 deaths
1935 births
20th-century Brazilian male writers
Brazilian male dramatists and playwrights